Sozos Andreou (born September 6, 1969) is a Cypriot former international football defender.

He started his career in 1992 with Anorthosis Famagusta. He also played for AEL Limassol and Alki Larnaca.

External links
 

1969 births
Living people
Cypriot footballers
Cyprus international footballers
Greek Cypriot people
Association football defenders
AEL Limassol players
Alki Larnaca FC players
Anorthosis Famagusta F.C. players
People from Famagusta